Kevin Makely (born August 29, 1973) is an American actor and producer.

Early life and education
Makely was a 1992 graduate of Roy C. Ketcham High School in Wappinger Falls in Dutchess County, New York State.

Career
In 2019 Makely produced and starred in Justin Lee’s Badland as a Pinkerton detective tracking down Confederate soldiers with things to hide, in a cast that included Academy Award winner Mira Sorvino and multiple nominee Bruce Dern. Badland had success, after a small cinema release in November 2019, on streaming platform Netflix spending time in their top 10 most watched, peaking at number 3.

In 2020 Makely was cast as the legendary professional wrestler Randy Savage in the television series Young Rock, which is based on the early life of Dwayne Johnson.

References

External links

Living people
Male actors from New York (state)
Film producers from New York (state)
People from Dutchess County, New York
Date of birth missing (living people)
Place of birth missing (living people)
Year of birth missing (living people)
20th-century births